Parewanui is a settlement situated southeast of Bulls in the North Island of New Zealand.

History
The area was named for Parewanui Pā, one of several populated by Ngāti Apa in the early 19th century. The pā site was purchased by the government as part of the Rangitikei Manawatū block in 1866.
 
A Parewanui School flourished by 1885 but closed at the beginning of 2003.

Demographics

There were 315 households. There were 429 males and 429 females, giving a sex ratio of 1.0 males per female. The median age was 40.5 years (compared with 37.4 years nationally), with 189 people (22.1%) aged under 15 years, 129 (15.1%) aged 15 to 29, 435 (50.9%) aged 30 to 64, and 105 (12.3%) aged 65 or older.

Ethnicities were 93.3% European/Pākehā, 15.1% Māori, 1.4% Pacific peoples, 0.7% Asian, and 1.8% other ethnicities (totals add to more than 100% since people could identify with multiple ethnicities).

The proportion of people born overseas was 9.1%, compared with 27.1% nationally.

Although some people objected to giving their religion, 58.2% had no religion, 32.6% were Christian and 3.5% had other religions.

Of those at least 15 years old, 93 (14.0%) people had a bachelor or higher degree, and 147 (22.1%) people had no formal qualifications. The median income was $36,000, compared with $31,800 nationally. The employment status of those at least 15 was that 384 (57.7%) people were employed full-time, 96 (14.4%) were part-time, and 21 (3.2%) were unemployed.

See also
Flock House

References

Populated places in Manawatū-Whanganui
Populated places on the Rangitīkei River